The British Academy Children and Young People Award for Preschool Animation is an award presented annually by the British Academy of Film and Television Arts (BAFTA). It is given to "animated content for children under six". Through the ninetiees, preschool animated productions were awarded alongside live-action series in a category named Preschool. 

In 2000, two categories were created, one for each type of production (animation and live-action). The first recipient of the category was CITV's series Maisy. CBeebies' series Hey Duggee holds the record of most wins in the category with four, followed by Peppa Pig with three, and Charlie and Lola and Timmy Time with two each. Peppa Pig is the most nominated program in the category with eleven nominations, followed by Hey Duggee with six and Little Princess with four.

Winners and nominees

1990s
Pre-School

2000s
Preschool - Animation

2010s

2020s

Note: The series that don't have recipients on the tables had Production team credited as recipients for the award or nomination.

Multiple winners

Multiple nominations

References

External links
Official website

Preschool Animation